Sinai Disengagement Agreements may refer to one of the following:
 Sinai Interim Agreement of 1975
 Israel-Egypt Disengagement Treaty of 1974

These agreements were concluded in the wake of the Yom Kippur War, as a gradual Israeli–Egyptian peace process was launched.

See also
 Camp David Accords
 Egypt–Israel peace treaty

Arab–Israeli conflict